R. John Collier (born August 6, 1938) is an American microbiologist and biochemist. He is the Maude and Lillian Presley Professor of Microbiology and Immunobiology, Emeritus at Harvard Medical School.

Early life and education 
Collier was born in Wichita Falls, Texas on August 6, 1938. He earned a Bachelor of Arts from Rice University in 1959. He completed a Master of Science in 1961 and a Doctor of Philosophy in biology at Harvard University in 1964.

Career 
Collier was on the faculty at University of California, Los Angeles beginning in 1966. Collier held a Guggenheim Fellowship from 1973 to 1974 at Pasteur Institute. In 1984, he started at Harvard Medical School. He became the Maude and Lillian Presley Professor of Microbiology and Immunobiology in 1989. At Harvard, Collier served as the Faculty Dean for Graduate Education, Chairman of the Division of Medical Science and Acting Head of the Department of Microbiology and Molecular Genetics. He is a professor emeritus at Harvard.

Awards and honors 
In 1972, Collier won the Eli Lilly Award in Microbiology and Immunology from the American Society for Microbiology. He received the Paul Ehrlich and Ludwig Darmstaedter Prize in 1990. In 1991, he was elected into the National Academy of Sciences. Collier received the Selman A. Waksman Award in Microbiology in 1999. In 2003, he won the 13th Bristol-Myers Squibb Infectious Disease Research Award. Collier is an elected member of the American Academy of Arts and Sciences and the American Society for Microbiology.

Personal life 
Collier married in 1962.

References 

Living people
Rice University alumni
Harvard Graduate School of Arts and Sciences alumni
University of California, Los Angeles faculty
Harvard Medical School faculty
Members of the United States National Academy of Sciences
Fellows of the American Academy of Arts and Sciences
American microbiologists
21st-century American biochemists
20th-century American biochemists
1938 births
People from Wichita Falls, Texas
Scientists from Texas
Fellows of the American Academy of Microbiology